Although women in Japan were recognized as having equal legal rights to men after World War II, economic conditions for women remain unbalanced. Modern policy initiatives to encourage motherhood and workplace participation have had mixed results.

Women in Japan obtained the right to vote in 1945. While Japanese women's status has steadily improved in the decades since then, traditional expectations for married women and mothers are cited as a barrier to full economic equality. The monarchy is strictly male-only and a princess has to resign her imperial title if she marries a commoner.

Cultural history

The extent to which women could participate in Japanese society has varied over time and social classes. In the 8th century, Japan had an empress, and in the 12th century during the Heian period, women in Japan could inherit property in their own names and manage it by themselves: "Women could own property, be educated, and were allowed, if discrete (sic), to take lovers."

From the late Edo period, the status of women declined. In the 17th century, the "Onna Daigaku", or "Learning for Women", by Confucianist author Kaibara Ekken, spelled out expectations for Japanese women, stating that "such is the stupidity of her character that it is incumbent on her, in every particular, to distrust herself and to obey her husband".

During the Meiji period, industrialization and urbanization reduced the authority of fathers and husbands, but at the same time the Meiji Civil Code of 1898 (specifically the introduction of the "ie" system) denied women legal rights and subjugated them to the will of household heads.

Behavioral expectations

In interviews with Japanese housewives in 1985, researchers found that socialized feminine behavior in Japan followed several patterns of modesty, tidiness, courtesy, compliance, and self-reliance. Modesty extended to the effective use of silence in both daily conversations and activities. Tidiness included personal appearance and a clean home. Courtesy, another trait, was called upon from women in domestic roles and in entertaining guests, extended to activities such as preparing and serving tea.

Lebra's traits for internal comportment of femininity included compliance; for example, children were expected not to refuse their parents. Self-reliance of women was encouraged because needy women were seen as a burden on others. In these interviews with Japanese families, Lebra found that girls were assigned helping tasks while boys were more inclined to be left to schoolwork. Lebra's work has been critiqued for focusing specifically on a single economic segment of Japanese women.

Although Japan remains a socially conservative society, with relatively pronounced gender roles, Japanese women and Japanese society are quite different from the strong stereotypes that exist in foreign media or travel guides, which paint the women in Japan as 'submissive' and devoid of any self-determination. Another strong stereotype about Japan is that women always stay in the home as housewives and that they do not participate in public life: in reality most women are employed – the employment rate of women (age 15–64) is 69.6% (data from OECD 2018).

Political status of women

Women were given the right to vote in 1945, after the Japanese surrender in WWII. As the new de facto ruler of Japan, Douglas MacArthur ordered the drafting of a new constitution for Japan in February 1946. Four women were in the working group, including Beate Sirota Gordon who was enlisted to the subcommittee assigned to writing the section of the constitution devoted to civil rights and women's rights in Japan. This allowed them greater freedom, equality to men, and a higher status within Japanese society. Other postwar reforms opened education institutions to women and required that women receive equal pay for equal work. In 1986, the Equal Employment Opportunity Law took effect, prohibiting discrimination in aspects like dismissal and retirement. The law was revised in 1997 to be more comprehensive, prohibiting discrimination in recruitment and promotion as well. Another round of revision in 2006 also prohibits job requirements that disproportionately advantage one gender over another, or indirect discrimination. However, women remain economically disadvantaged as a wage gap remains between full-time male and female workers. There also exists a wage gap between full-time and irregular workers despite the rising percentage of irregular workers among women.

Female representation in politics 

In 1994, Japan implemented electoral reform and introduced a mixed electoral system that included both single-member districts (SMD) using plurality and a party list system with proportional representation. In general, the proportion of female legislators in the House of Representatives has grown since the reform. However, when it comes to women's representation in politics, Japan remains behind other developed democracies as well as many developing countries. As of 2019, Japan ranks 164th out of 193 countries when it comes to the percentage of women in the lower or single house. In the 2021 Japanese general election, less than 18 percent of candidates (186 out of 1051) for the House of Representatives were women. Of these 186 candidates, 45 were elected, constituting 9.7 percent of the 465 seats in the lower chamber. This number represents a decline from the 2017 general election, which resulted in women winning 10.1 percent of House seats.  The decrease in women's representation has taken place although the Japanese government has expressed a will to address this inequality of numbers in the 21st century of the Heisei period through several focused initiatives, and a 2012 poll by the Cabinet Office found that nearly 70% of all Japanese polled agreed that men were given preferential treatment.

Japanese women fare better when it comes to local politics. As of 2015, women made up 27.8% of the local assemblies in the Tokyo's Special Wards, 17.4% in designated cities, 16.1% in general cities, 10.4% in towns and villages, and 9.1% in prefectures. In 2019, the proportion of female candidates in local assembly elections hit a record high of 17.3% in city assembly elections and 12.1% in town and village assembly elections. Similar to that in national politics, women's representation in Japan's local politics has seen a general upward trend since the 20th century, but still lags behind other developed countries.

In the 2022 Japanese House of Councillors election a record 35 women were elected to Japan's House of Councillors, the country's upper house. The number of women candidates at the election also reached a record high of 181.

The LDP and female representation 
The Liberal Democratic Party (LDP) has made promises to increase the presence of women in Japanese politics, but has not achieved their stated goals. For example, in 2003, the LDP expressed commitment to achieving 30% female representation in political and administrative positions by 2020 per international norms. However, they remain far from this number. Scholars have noted that the internal structure and rules of the LDP does not favor female candidates. The LDP often seeks out candidates with experience in bureaucracy or local politics, which disadvantages women since they are less likely to have been in these positions. The LDP also has a bottom-up nomination process, whereby the initial nominations are made by local party offices. As these local offices are dominated by men, or the old boys' network, it is difficult for Japanese women to be nominated by the LDP. A break from this bottom-up process took place in 2005, when Prime Minister and President of the LDP Junichiro Koizumi himself placed women at the top of the PR lists. As a result, all of the 26 LDP's women candidates won either by plurality in their SMD or from the PR list. However, Koizumi's top-down nomination was not a reflection of the LDP's prioritization of gender equality, but rather a political strategy to draw in votes by signaling change. After this election, the LDP has returned to its bottom-up nomination process.

Opposition parties and female representation 
In 1989, the Japan Socialist Party (JSP), the largest left-wing opposition party to the LDP at the time, succeeded in electing 22 women to the Diet.  The record number of women elected to the Diet was dubbed the "Madonna Boom." Under the leadership of Takako Doi, the JSP ran women outside of conventional political circles and emphasized their clean, "outsider" status to juxtapose themselves against the LDP, who were facing accusations of bribery, a sex scandal, and public dismay at its consumption tax policies at the time. As a result, these "Madonnas" were typical housewives with little to no political experience. However, the JSP quickly lost momentum afterwards. In the 1992 House of Councillors election, only 4 women members of the JSP were reelected. The JSP also failed to take advantage of the Madonna Boom to institutionalize gender quotas due to other priorities on its agenda.

Another spike in the number of women in the Japanese Diet came in 2009, when the Democratic Party of Japan (DPJ) took over the House of Representatives from the LDP in a landslide victory. Out of the 46 female candidates ran by the DPJ, 40 were elected. However, the DPJ also failed to capitalize on this momentum to institutionalize gender quotas. While the DPJ implemented a few non-quota policies with the aim of increasing women's representation, the effects of these policies were only marginal. Similar to the LDP in 2005, the DPJ ran a large number of women candidates not because the party cared about gender equality, but due to political strategy. In fact, the DPJ imitated Prime Minister Koizumi's strategy of indicating reform and societal change through its nomination of women.

Explanations of low female representation 
Survey experiments show that Japanese voters do not have a bias against female candidates; rather, the low levels of female representation in Japanese politics is due to Japanese women's reluctance to seek office. Japanese women are less likely to run for office because of socially mandated gender roles, which dictate that women should take care of children and the household. Research suggests that Japanese women are more willing to run for office if parties provide support with household duties during the campaign. Women candidates of reproductive age are also less likely than men to run in SMD in Japan, as opposed to party-list seats, which can be explained by the higher time commitment associated with running in SMD. Furthermore, when Japanese women marry, they often have to leave their home and move in with their husbands. As a result, Japanese women are less able to run for local assemblies because they lack connections with their locality.

The gender roles that discourage Japanese women from seeking elected office have been further consolidated through Japan's model of the welfare state. In particular, since the postwar period, Japan has adopted the "male breadwinner" model, which favors a nuclear-family household in which the husband is the breadwinner for the family while the wife is a dependant. When the wife is not employed, the family is eligible for social insurance services and tax deductions. With this system, the Japanese state can depend on the housewives for care-related work, which reduces state social expenditures. Yet, the "male breadwinner" model has also entrenched gender roles by providing an optimal life course for families that discourage women participating in public life.

Sexism and harassment in politics 
Given the dominance of men in Japanese politics, female politicians often face gender-based discrimination and harassment in Japan. They experience harassment from the public, both through social media and in-person interactions, and from their male colleagues. A 2021 survey revealed that 56.7% of 1,247 female local assembly members had been sexually harassed by voters or other politicians.  Even though the 1997 revision of the EEOL criminalized sexual harassment in the workplace, female politicians in Japan often do not have the same support when they are harassed by male colleagues. The LDP has been reluctant to implement measures to counter harassment within the party and to promote gender equality more generally. However, vocal female politicians of the party like Seiko Noda have publicly condemned male politicians' sexist statements.

Professional life

During the 21st century, Japanese women are working in higher proportions than the United States's working female population. Income levels between men and women in Japan are not equal; the average Japanese woman earns 40 percent less than the average man, and a tenth of management positions are held by women. Women are often found in part time or temporary jobs. 77% of these jobs were filled by women in 2012. Among women who do work, women-only unions are small in size and in relative power.
A common occupation for young women is that of office lady, that is, a female office worker who performs generally pink collar tasks such as serving tea and secretarial or clerical work.

Japan has a strong tradition of women being housewives after marriage. When mothers do work, they often pick up part-time, low-paying jobs based on their children's or husband's schedule. Taking care of the family and household is seen as a predominately female role, and working women are expected to fulfill it. Nevertheless, in recent years the number of women who work has increased: in 2014, women made up 42.7% of the labour force of Japan. Japan has an especially high proportion of women who work part-time, and a majority of those women are mothers.

In one poll, 30% of mothers who returned to work reported being victims of "maternity harassment", or "matahara". The obento box tradition, where mothers prepare elaborate lunches for their children to take to school, is an example of a domestic female role.

A number of government and private post-war policies have contributed to a gendered division of labor. These include a family wage offered by corporations which subsidized health and housing subsidies, marriage bonuses and additional bonuses for each child; and pensions for wives who earn below certain incomes. Additionally, in 1961, income for wives of working men were untaxed below $10,000; income above that amount contributed to overall household income. Corporate culture also plays a role; while many men are expected to socialize with their managers after long work days, women may find trouble balancing child-rearing roles with the demands of mandatory after-work social events.

Some economists suggest that a better support system for working mothers, such as a shorter daily work schedule, would allow more women to work, increasing Japan's economic growth. To that end, in 2003, the Japanese government set a goal to have 30% of senior government roles filled by women. In 2015, only 3.5% were; the government has since slashed the 2020 goal to 7%, and set a private industry goal to 15%.

Family life

The traditional role of women in Japan has been defined as "three submissions": young women submit to their fathers; married women submit to their husbands, and elderly women submit to their sons. Strains of this arrangement can be seen in contemporary Japan, where housewives are responsible for cooking, cleaning, child-rearing and support their husbands to work without any worries about family, as well as balancing the household's finances. Yet, as the number of dual-income households rises, women and men are sharing household chores, and research shows that this has led to increased satisfaction over households that divide labor in traditional ways.

Families, prior to and during the Meiji restoration, relied on a patriarchal lineage of succession, with disobedience to the male head of the household punishable by expulsion from the family unit. Male heads of households with only daughters would adopt male heirs to succeed them, sometimes through arranged marriage to a daughter. Heads of households were responsible for house finances, but could delegate to another family member or retainer (employee). Women in these households were typically subject to arranged marriages at the behest of the household's patriarch, with more than half of all marriages in Japan being preemptively arranged until the 1960s. Married women marked themselves by blackening their teeth and shaving their eyebrows.

After the Meiji period, the head of the household was required to approve of any marriage. Until 1908, it remained legal for husbands to murder wives for infidelity.

As late as the 1930s, arranged marriages continued, and so-called "love matches" were thought to be rare and somewhat scandalous, especially for the husband, who would be thought "effeminate".

The Post-War Constitution, however, codified women's right to choose their partners. Article 24 of Japan's Constitution states:

Marriage shall be based only on the mutual consent of both sexes and it shall be maintained through mutual cooperation with the equal rights of husband and wife as a basis. With regard to choice of spouse, property rights, inheritance, choice of domicile, divorce and other matters pertaining to marriage and the family, laws shall be enacted from the standpoint of individual dignity and the essential equality of the sexes.

This established several changes to women's roles in the family, such as the right to inherit the family home or land, and the right of women (over the age of 20) to marry without the consent of the house patriarch.

In the early Meiji period, many girls married at age 16; by the post-war period, it had risen to 23, and continued to rise. The average age for a Japanese woman's first marriage has steadily risen since 1970, from 24 to 29.3 years old in 2015.

Right to divorce
In the Tokugawa period, men could divorce their wives simply through stating their intention to do so in a letter. Wives could not legally arrange for a divorce, but options included joining convents, such as at Kamakura, where men were not permitted to go, thus assuring a permanent separation.

Under the Meiji system, however, the law limited grounds for divorce to seven events: sterility, adultery, disobedience to the parents-in-law, loquacity, larceny, jealousy, and disease. However, the law offered a protection for divorcees by guaranteeing a wife could not be sent away if she had nowhere else to go. Furthermore, the law allowed a woman to request a divorce, so long as she was accompanied by a male relative and could prove desertion or imprisonment of the husband, profligacy, or mental or physical illness.

By 1898, cruelty was added to the grounds for a woman to divorce; the law also allowed divorce through mutual agreement of the husband and wife. However, children were assumed to remain with the male head of the household. In contemporary Japan, children are more likely to live with single mothers than single fathers; in 2013, 7.4% of children were living in single-mother households; only 1.3% live with their fathers.

When divorce was granted under equal measures to both sexes under the post-war constitution, divorce rates steadily increased.

In 2015, Article 733 of Japan's Civil Code that states that women cannot remarry 6 months after divorce was reduced to 100 days. The 6 month ban on remarriage for women was previously aiming to "avoid uncertainty regarding the identity of the legally presumed father of any child born in that time period". Under article 772, presumes that after a divorce, a child born 300 days after divorce is the legal child of the previous husband. A ruling issued on December 16, 2015, the Supreme Court of Japan ruled that in light of the new 100 days before women's remarriage law, so that there is no confusion over the paternity of a child born to a woman who remarried, any child born after 200 days of remarriage is the legal child of the current husband.

The Ministry of Japan revealed the outline of an amendment for the Civil Code of Japan on February 18, 2016. This amendment shortens the women's remarriage period to 100 days and allows any woman who is not pregnant during the divorce to remarry immediately after divorce.

Surname change
The Civil Code of Japan requires legally married spouses to have the same surname. Although the law is gender-neutral, meaning that either spouse is allowed to change his/her name to that of the other spouse, Japanese women have traditionally adopted their husband's family name and 96% of women continue to do so as of 2015. In 2015, the Japanese Supreme Court upheld the constitutionality of the law, noting that women could use their maiden names informally, and stating that it was for the legislature to decide on whether to pass new legislation on separate spousal names.

Motherhood

While women before the Meiji period were often considered incompetent in the raising of children, the Meiji period saw motherhood as the central task of women, and allowed education of women toward this end. Raising children and keeping household affairs in order were seen as women's role in the state. Women's political and social advancement was thus tied to their role as mothers.

Today, Japanese mothers are still seen as managers of a household, including the behavior of their children. For example, media reports often focus on the apologies of criminals' mothers.

There is continuing debate about the role women's education plays in Japan's declining birthrate. Japan's total fertility rate is 1.4 children born per woman (2015 estimate), which is below the replacement rate of 2.1. Japanese women have their first child at an average age of 30.3 (2012 estimate).

Government policies to increase the birthrate include early education designed to develop citizens into capable parents. Some critics of these policies believe that this emphasis on birth rate is incompatible with a full recognition of women's equality in Japan.

Education

With the development of society, more and more girls are going to colleges to receive higher education. Today, more than half of Japanese women are college or university graduates. The proportion of female researchers in Japan is 14.6%.

Modern education of women began in earnest during the Meiji era's modernization campaign. The first schools for women began during this time, though education topics were highly gendered, with women learning arts of the samurai class, such as tea ceremonies and flower arrangement. The 1871 education code established that students should be educated "without any distinction of class or sex". Nonetheless, after 1891 students were typically segregated after third grade, and many girls did not extend their educations past middle school.

By the end of the Meiji period, there was a women's school in every prefecture in Japan, operated by a mix of government, missionary, and private interests. By 1910, very few universities accepted women. Graduation was not assured, as often women were pulled out of school to marry or to study "practical matters".

Notably, Tsuruko Haraguchi, the first woman in Japan to earn a PhD, did so in the US, as no Meiji-era institution would allow her to receive her doctorate. She and other women who studied abroad and returned to Japan, such as Yoshioka Yayoi and Tsuda Umeko, were among the first wave of women's educators who lead the way to the incorporation of women in Japanese academia.

After 1945, the Allied occupation aimed to enforce equal education between sexes; this included a recommendation in 1946 to provide compulsory co-education until the age of 16. By the end of 1947, nearly all middle schools and more than half of high schools were co-educational.

In 2012, 98.1% of female students and 97.8% of male students were able to reach senior high school. Of those, 55.6% of men and 45.8% of women continued with undergraduate studies, although 10% of these female graduates attended junior college.

Religion

The first female Zen master in Japan was the Japanese abbess Mugai Nyodai (born 1223 - died 1298).

In 1872, the Japanese government issued an edict (May 4, 1872, Grand Council of State Edict 98) stating, "Any remaining practices of female exclusion on shrine and temple lands shall be immediately abolished, and mountain climbing for the purpose of worship, etc., shall be permitted". However, women in Japan today do not have complete access to all such places.

In 1998 the General Assembly of the Nippon Sei Ko Kai (Anglican Church in Japan) started to ordain women.

Women in Japan were forbidden from participation in Yamakasa, parades in which Shinto shrines are carried through a town, until 2001.

Health
At 87 years, the life expectancy of Japanese women is the longest of any gender anywhere in the world.

Abortion in Japan is legal under some restrictions. The number per year has declined by 500,000 since 1975. Of the 200,000 abortions performed per year, however, 10% are teenage women, a number which has risen since 1975.

Laws against crime

Domestic violence
In Japan, domestic disputes have traditionally been seen as a result of negligence or poor support from the female partner. A partner's outburst can therefore be a source of shame to the wife or mother of the man they are supposed to care for. Because women's abuse would be detrimental to the family of the abused, legal, medical and social intervention in domestic disputes was rare.

After a spate of research during the 1990s, Japan passed the Prevention of Spousal Violence and the Protection of Victims act in 2001. The law referred to domestic violence as "a violation of the constitutional principle of equal rights between sexes". This law established protection orders from abusive spouses and created support centers in every prefecture, but women are still reluctant to report abuse to doctors out of shame or fear that the report would be shared with the abuser. A 2001 survey showed that many health professionals were not trained to handle domestic abuse and blamed women who sought treatment.

In 2013, 100,000 women reported domestic violence to shelters. Of the 10,000 entering protective custody at the shelter, nearly half arrived with children or other family members.

Stalking
Anti-stalking laws were passed in 2000 after the media attention given to the murder of a university student who had been a stalking victim. With nearly 21,000 reports of stalking in 2013, 90.3% of the victims were women and 86.9% of the perpetrators were men. Anti-stalking laws in Japan were expanded in 2013 to include e-mail harassment, after the widely publicized 2012 murder of a young woman who had reported such harassment to police. Stalking reports are growing at a faster rate in Japan than any other country.

Sex trafficking

Japanese and foreign women and girls have been victims of sex trafficking in Japan. They are raped in brothels and other locations and experience physical and psychological trauma. Japanese anti-sex trafficking legislation and laws have been criticized as being lacking.

Sexual assault

Surveys show that between 28% and 70% of women have been groped on train cars. Some railway companies designate women-only passenger cars though there are no penalties for men to ride in a women-only car. Gropers can be punished with seven years or less of jail time and/or face fines of just under $500.

The use of women-only cars in Japan has been critiqued from various perspectives. Some suggest that the presence of the cars makes women who choose not to use them more vulnerable. Public comment sometimes include the argument that women-only cars are a step too far in protecting women. Some academics have argued that the cars impose the burden of social segregation to women, rather than seeking the punishment of criminals. Another critique suggests the cars send the signal that men create a dangerous environment for women, who cannot protect themselves.

Beauty
The Japanese cosmetics industry is the second largest in the world, earning over $15 billion per year. The strong market for beauty products has been connected to the value placed on self-discipline and self-improvement in Japan, where the body is mastered through kata, repeated actions aspiring toward perfection, such as bowing.

In the Heian period, feminine beauty standards favored darkened teeth, some body fat, and eyebrows painted above the original (which were shaved).

Beauty corporations have had a role in creating contemporary standards of beauty in Japan since the Meiji era. For example, the Japanese cosmetics firm, Shiseido published a magazine, Hannatsubaki, with beauty advice for women emphasizing hair styles and contemporary fashion. The pre-war "modern girl" of Japan followed Western fashions as filtered through this kind of Japanese media.

Products reflect several common anxieties among Japanese women. Multiple polls suggest that women worry about "fatness, breast size, hairiness and bust size". The idealized figure of a Japanese woman is generally fragile and petite. Japanese beauty ideals favor small features and narrow faces. Big eyes are admired, especially when they have "double eyelids".

Another ideal is pale skin. Tanned skin was historically associated with the working-class, and pale skin associated with the nobility. Many women in Japan will take precaution to avoid the sun, and some lotions are sold to make the skin whiter.

By the 1970s, "cuteness" had emerged as a desirable aesthetic, which some scholars linked to a boom in comic books that emphasized young-looking girls, or Lolitas. While these characters typically included larger eyes, research suggests that it was not a traditional standard of beauty in Japan, preferred in medical research and described as "unsightly" by cosmetic researchers of the Edo era.

Clothing is another element in beauty standards for women in Japan, especially with traditional aesthetics. Again, femininity is a large factor; therefore, pinks, reds, bows, and frills are all found in their apparel. Kimonos, full-length silk robes, are worn by women on special occasions. Traditional patterns for women include many varieties of flowers found in Japan and across Asia such as cherry blossoms, lilies, chrysanthemums and camellia japonica flowers.

Some employers require their female workers to wear high heels and forbid eye glasses.

Geisha

A  is a traditional Japanese female entertainer who acts as a hostess and whose skills include performing various Japanese arts such as classical music, dance, games, serving tea and conversation, mainly to entertain male customers. Geisha are trained very seriously as skilled entertainers and are not to be confused with prostitutes. The training program starts from a young age, typically 15 years old, and can take anywhere from six months to three years.

A young geisha in training, under the age of 20, is called a maiko. Maiko (literally "dance girl") are apprentice geisha, and this stage can last for years. Maiko learn from their senior geisha mentor and follow them to all their engagements. Then at around the age of 20–22, the maiko is promoted to a full-fledged geisha in a ceremony called erikae (turning of the collar).

Contraception and sexuality

In Japan, the contraceptive pill was legalized in 1999, much later than in most Western countries. Its use is still low, with many couples preferring condoms. Sexuality in Japan has developed separately from mainland Asia, and Japan did not adopt the Confucian view of marriage in which chastity is highly valued. However, births outside marriage remain rare in Japan.

Culture

Anime 
 Magical girl, is a subgenre of Japanese fantasy media (including anime, manga, light novels, and live-action media) centered around young girls who possess magical abilities, which they typically use through an ideal alter ego into which they can transform.
 List of idol anime and manga

See also
Birth control in Japan
Empress of Japan
Family policy in Japan
Feminism in Japan
Gender Equality Bureau, Japan
Good Wife, Wise Mother
Gyaru
Hinamatsuri
Kyariaūman (career woman in Japan)
Overview of gender inequality in Japan
Shōjo
Women in agriculture in Japan
Yamato nadeshiko
Nyonin Kinsei Women in Shinto

History:
Kunoichi, female spies
Onna-bugeisha, female warriors

References
 - Japan

Further reading
 
 
 Aoki, Debora. Widows of Japan: An anthropological perspective (Trans Pacific Press, 2010).
 Bardsley, Jan. Women and Democracy in Cold War Japan (Bloomsbury, 2015) excerpt.
 Bernstein, Lee Gail. ed. Recreating Japanese Women, 1600–1945 (U of California Press, 1991).
 Brinton, Mary C. Women and the economic miracle: Gender and work in postwar Japan (U of California Press, 1993).
 Copeland, Rebecca L. Lost leaves: women writers of Meiji Japan (U of Hawaii Press, 2000).
 Faison, Elyssa. Managing women: Disciplining labor in modern Japan (U of California Press, 2007).
 
 
 Gayle, Curtis Anderson. Women's history and local community in postwar Japan (Routledge, 2013). excerpt
 
 Gulliver, Katrina. Modern women in China and Japan: Gender, feminism and global modernity between the wars (IB Tauris, 2012).
 Hastings, Sally A. "Gender and Sexuality in Modern Japan." in A Companion to Japanese History (2007): 372+.
 
 LaFleur, William R. Liquid Life: Abortion and Buddhism in Japan (Princeton UP, 1992).
 Lebra, Joyce C. Women in changing Japan (Routledge, 20190 
 
 Patessio, Mara. Women and public life in early Meiji Japan: The development of the feminist movement (U of Michigan Press, 2020). 
 Robins-Mowry, Dorothy. The hidden sun: Women of modern Japan (Westview Press, 1983) 
 Sato, Barbara. The New Japanese Woman: Modernity, Media, and Women in Interwar Japan (Duke UP, 2003).

External links

Japanese Equal Employment Opportunity Law
 "Gender and Sexuality in Japan" syllabus by Professor Jeffry T. Hester

 
Japan
Japan